The White Adventure is a 1952 West German comedy crime film directed by Arthur Maria Rabenalt and starring Joe Stöckel, Lucie Englisch and Adrian Hoven. It set at a ski resort on the Bavarian border with Austria, where smuggling is taking place.

Cast
Joe Stöckel as Josef Stutzinger
Lucie Englisch as Franzi Schlott
Adrian Hoven as Dr. Peter Wiedemann
Josefin Kipper as Lotte Wendel
Margot Rupp as Katharina Brandl
Marianne Wischmann as Lydia Bartnik
Fee von Reichlin as Winii Pardubitz
Willem Holsboer as Alois Brandl
Franz Muxeneder as Nikolaus
Hugo Lindinger as Bürgermeister
Vera Complojer as Frau Elise
Armin Dahlen as Skilehrer Fasser
Gerd Frickhöffer as Her Wimmer
Curt A. Tichy as Mr. Keates

References

External links

1950s crime comedy films
German crime comedy films
West German films
Films directed by Arthur Maria Rabenalt
Skiing films
Films set in the Alps
1950s German-language films
1950s German films